Coppard is a surname. Notable people with the surname include:

 A. E. Coppard (1878–1957), British writer and poet
 George Coppard (1898–1985), British soldier
 Sandra Coppard, Rhodesian Paralympic athlete
 Oliver Coppard (born 1981), British politician